Boscana is a surname. Notable people with the surname include:

Gerónimo Boscana, early nineteenth-century Franciscan missionary in Spanish and Mexican California
Lucy Boscana (1915–2001), actress and a pioneer in Puerto Rico's television industry

See also
Boşcana, commune in Criuleni district, Moldova